Santa Cruz Weekly was a free-circulation weekly newspaper published in Santa Cruz, California. It began publishing under its current name on May 6, 2009; publication ceased when operations were merged with the competing Good Times weekly on April 2, 2014 with the merged company continuing as Good Times. Formerly known as Metro Santa Cruz, the alternative weekly covered news, people, culture and entertainment in Santa Cruz County, a coastal area that includes Capitola, Aptos, Boulder Creek, Scotts Valley and Watsonville.

Locally based in Santa Cruz, the alternative weekly was owned by Metro Newspapers, a company started by former Santa Cruz publisher Dan Pulcrano. The company also published Metro in the adjacent Santa Clara Valley, a.k.a. Silicon Valley and the North Bay Bohemian in the Sonoma/Napa/Marin area. In 2014, Metro bought the competing alternative weekly, Good Times, and merged the two papers under the Good Times banner.

Founded as Metro Santa Cruz
Metro Santa Cruz began publishing in 1994 and continued under that name until it became Santa Cruz Weekly in 2009. The founding editors' stated objective was to continue a local tradition of independent journalism that had included such publications as Free Spaghetti Dinner, Sundaze, Santa Cruz Independent, an unrelated publication in the 1980s called Santa Cruz Weekly, Santa Cruz Express and Santa Cruz Sun.

Relaunched under new name
The name change remained a secret until the publication hit the streets on May 6, 2009. The design was developed in-house by a team led by Metro Newspapers design director Kara Brown. The first issue featured a black and white illustration by longtime Santa Cruz illustrator Futzie Nutzle and a cover story on the Santa Cruz Film Festival. The editors stated that they selected the name because they were tired of being confused with the local public transit system of the same name, as well as to throw down a stake for newspapers following the shutdowns of several daily newspapers in early 2009, including the Rocky Mountain News and Seattle Post-Intelligencer. “At a transformative moment in the publishing industry, we've adopted a decidedly newspaper-y name to express our optimism about weekly print,” they wrote and suggested that business was rising rather than declining like the rest of the industry. “From a business standpoint, the last two years have been our best ones, which is counterintuitive,” the signed editorial stated.

The Santa Cruz Weekly’s logo was drawn by noted Northern California typeface designer Jim Parkinson.

Web and social media strategy
The publication was affiliated with the SantaCruz.com community web portal, operated by a sister company, Boulevards New Media. In a decidedly 2009 twist, its Twitter and Facebook pages went live in advance of the print edition, a launch strategy that established social media presence before papers hit the street. "Our goal is to deliver Santa Cruz County's best suite of local information and marketing services to Santa Cruz residents, visitors and businesses," the editors wrote.

Purchase of Good Times

On March 31, 2014, the Weekly’s publishers announced that the company had acquired its principal competitor, Good Times, after which the SCW was folded into GT, the combined newspapers continuing under the better-established Good Times name.

Awards
Alt-Weekly Awards awarded by the Association of Alternative Newsweeklies
Feature Writing, 2nd Place (Life and Death on The Pajaro River Levee, Jessica Lussenhop), 2010
Multimedia, 2nd Place (The Aztecas of South Santa Cruz County, Jessica Lussenhop), 2010
Food Writing, 1st Place (The Jester's Quest, Christina Waters), 2009
Arts Feature, 3rd Place (Unlock & Roll, Curtis Cartier), 2009
Editorial Layout, 2nd Place (Kara Brown and Tabi Zarrinnaal), 2007
Food Writing, 1st Place (Kraut in the Act by Steve Billings), 2005
Music Criticism, 3rd Place (Steve Palopoli), 2005
Music Criticism, 2nd Place (David Espinoza), 2001
Photography, 1st Place (Breadth of Life by George Sakkestad), 2000
Arts Criticism, 2nd Place (J. Douglas Allen-Taylor), 1999
Arts Criticism, 1st Place (Power Flick People by Traci Hukill), 1998
Film Criticism, 1st Place (The Prince of Plots by Richard von Busack), 1998
Arts Feature, 2nd Place (Mint Condition by Christina Waters), 1997; Photography, 1st Place (Robert Scheer), 1997
Food Writing, 1st Place: (Waiting For Merlot by Christina Waters), 1996

References

External links
Metropdf.com, Santa Cruz Weekly: PDF edition
SantaCruz.com
Santacruzweekly.com
Boulevards.com
Metronews.com, Metro Newspapers
Santacruzfb.com Santa Cruz Facebook
Twitter.com

Alternative weekly newspapers published in the United States
Weekly newspapers published in California
Publications established in 2009
Santa Cruz, California